Onell Design is an independent toy company and artist collective. They produce the Glyos System Series featuring the characters Pheyden, Exellis, Crayboth, Argen, Gobon, Armodoc, Armorvor, Noboto, Buildman, Skeleden, and various others. The toys are made of interchangeable parts, and hearken back to the durable, small-scale action figures of the 1980s, such as Adventure People. The figures can be described as a cross between an Action figure and Lego.  Onell Design toy figures are primarily sold directly by the manufacturer, although on occasion a release may be made available where a specially decorated figure is available elsewhere.

Background 
Onell Design has worked with several other independent toy companies over the years, helping with design, production, and incorporating The Glyos Peg System. The companies and their respective lines include: Culture Pirates' Bit Figs, Fantastic Plastic's Mystic Warriors of The Ring, Four Horsemen Design's Power Lords and Outer Space Men, The Godbeast's Kabuto Mushi and Nemesis, Little Rubber Guy's Rise of The Beasts, Nemo's Factory AVR Robot, Ni Stuff's 481 Universe, October Toy's Skeleton Warriors, Rawshark Studio's Callgrim, Rocket North's Planet Banimon, Spy Monkey Creation's Weaponeers of Monkaa and Battle Tribes, Toyfinity's Mordles, Robo Force, Zeroids, and Knight of Darkness, Toy Pizza's Knights of The Slice, True Cast Studio's The Walking Dud, Zullbeast and Zullens, Bio-Masters, Galaxxor, ManOrMonster? Studios' Warlords of Wor, Spaced Out Design's Geo, and Fallout's Mega Merge retail line.

Several mini figure lines have been manufactured by Onell Design such as October Toy's Outlandish Mini Figure Guys (OMFG) and October Toys Mini Figure Guys (OTMFG), Kaiju Big Battle, Last Resort Toys' Run-A-Mucks, and The Mini Figure Militia's Oozarian OMFG/OTMFG and Slime Pit Mordles collaborative exclusives.

There has also been numerous independent artists who have created resin and rubber Glyos compatible heads and accessories, such as 1Shot Toys, Cassetteman Studios, and Bah'glenn Creations.

Onell Design has also collaborated with international artist Real x Head in Japan.

The Glyos System Series received the #1 Best Mini Line Toy Award 2008 from the popular toy review site Plastic and Plush.

Onell Design's interchangeable vinyl piece "The Rig" was featured in MTV's Top Ten Toys of 2010.  Also in 2010, the Onell Design Glyos System was incorporated in a new line of Outer Space Men action figures.

In 2011, Onell Design introduced the Glyan, a 2 3/4-inch figure in various colors which includes Onell Design's first-ever humanoid head.  In 2012, they introduced an Armorvor, a production version of a figure which recalls Battle Beasts and offers the first-ever Onell Design production animal head.

See also
Micronauts
Designer toys
Kinkeshi

References

External links
 Onell Design Official Website
 Glyos System Official Blog
 Glyos/Onell Design Forum at October Toys

American artist groups and collectives
Companies based in Massachusetts
Toy brands
Toy companies of the United States